Polisportiva Club Sportivo Pisticci is an Italian association football club, based in Pisticci, Basilicata.

The club was founded in 1960.

Pisticci in the season 2010–11, from Serie D group H relegated, in the play-out, to [Eccellenza Basilicata]. Now is a futsal team that milited in serie B.

The team's colors are yellow and blue.

External links
Official homepage

Football clubs in Basilicata
Association football clubs established in 1960
Italian football clubs established in 1960